William Goodred or Godred (died c. 1448), of Horseheath, Cambridgeshire and Middleton, Norfolk, was an English politician.

Family
Goodred was the son of William Goodred of Horseheath, probably by his wife Joan. Goodred married Katherine née Shuldham of Marham, Norfolk, who had twice been widowed.

Career
He was a Member (MP) of the Parliament of England for Cambridgeshire in 1419.

References

Year of birth missing
1448 deaths
English MPs 1419
People from King's Lynn and West Norfolk (district)
People from Horseheath